Feyzabad (also Romanized as Feyẕābād, Faizābād, and Feiz Abad) is a village in Lay Siyah Rural District, in the Central District of Nain County, Isfahan Province, Iran. At the 2006 census, its population was 14, in 7 families.

References 

Populated places in Nain County